Álvaro de Luna Blanco (10 April 1935 – 2 November 2018) was a Spanish actor. He performed in more than one hundred films since 1961. He was most known for El Algarrobo in Curro Jiménez.

In 1963 he appeared in El verdugo, by Luis García Berlanga. In 1987 he appeared in the TV series Vísperas.

He died on 2 November 2018 from a hepatic insufficiency.

Selected filmography
 1965: That Man in Istanbul
 1965: All'ombra di una colt
 1967: The Viscount 
 1968: The Mercenary
 1968: Ballad of a Bounty Hunter
 1970: Un par de asesinos
 1970: Compañeros
 1974: Count Dracula's Great Love as Porteado
 1975: Order to Kill
 1982: El cabezota
 1985: Teo el pelirrojo
 2001: Lázaro de Tormes
 2001: Silencio roto as Don Hilario
 2002: Carol's Journey

References

External links
 

1935 births
2018 deaths
Spanish male film actors
Male actors from Madrid
20th-century Spanish male actors
21st-century Spanish male actors
Deaths from cancer in Spain
Deaths from liver cancer
Male Spaghetti Western actors